Mikhail Sergeyevich Klimchuk (born April 9, 1988) is a Russian professional ice hockey left winger. He is currently playing with PSK Sakhalin of Asia League Ice Hockey (ALIH).

Klimchuk previously played for his hometown team Amur Khabarovsk, playing 18 games during the 2006–07 Russian Superleague season and 44 games during the 2013–14 KHL season.

References

External links

1988 births
Living people
HC Almaty players
Amur Khabarovsk players
Ariada Volzhsk players
Neftyanik Almetyevsk players
Rubin Tyumen players
Russian ice hockey left wingers
HC Ryazan players
PSK Sakhalin players
Sportspeople from Khabarovsk
Yermak Angarsk players
Universiade medalists in ice hockey
Universiade gold medalists for Russia
Competitors at the 2015 Winter Universiade